George Baillie Duncan (born India, 1912; died Isle of Wight, 4 April 1997) was a prominent evangelical Anglican and Church of Scotland minister, and Keswick Convention speaker.

Biography 
George Duncan was born in India of missionary parents in 1912, and brought up in Scotland. Educated at Merchiston Castle School and the University of Edinburgh, he studied for the ministry at Tyndale Hall, Bristol. He served as curate at Broadwater Parish Church, Worthing, later ministering at St James's, Carlisle; St Thomas's English Episcopal Church, Edinburgh; and Christ Church, Cockfosters (1951-8), where he was succeeded by the Rev. Kenneth Hooker.  Returning to Scotland he ministered at Portland Church, Troon, for six years, before moving to St George's Tron Church, Glasgow, after the death of Tom Allan; he ministered here from 1965 to 1977. In retirement he was a member at the Edinburgh Barclay Church.

From 1947 he was a well-known speaker at the annual Keswick Convention; and also spoke regularly at the Filey Christian Holiday Crusade, organized by the Movement for World Evangelisation, of which he was the Chairman and President

He died on 4 April 1997 at his daughter's home on the Isle of Wight.

Works
 
 
 
 
  - later edition: The Renewing Spirit

Footnotes

References
 Preface to God so Loves... (Worthing, 1970), a booklet based on a series of BBC broadcast talks.

External links
 Audio sermons page

20th-century Church of England clergy
People educated at Merchiston Castle School
20th-century Ministers of the Church of Scotland
Alumni of the University of Edinburgh
1912 births
1997 deaths